Adetokunbo Ogundeji (born October 9, 1998) is an American football outside linebacker for the Atlanta Falcons of the National Football League (NFL). He played college football at Notre Dame.

Early life and high school
Ogundeji grew up in West Bloomfield, Michigan. He did not play football until his freshman year at Walled Lake Central High School. He originally committed to play at Western Michigan. As a junior, he had 68 tackles, nine sacks, 17 pass breakups and four fumble recoveries and ultimately de-committed from Western Michigan after being more heavily recruited. Ogundeji ultimately signed to play at Notre Dame. His senior season was cut short due to a knee injury.

College career
Ogundeji spent his freshman season on the scout team and did not appear in any games and played sparingly as a sophomore. He started to receive significant playing time in his junior season and finished the year with 25 total tackles, three tackles for loss, 1.5 sacks and two forced fumbles. As a senior, Ogundeji had 34 tackles, seven tackles for loss, 4.5 sacks, three forced fumbles and one fumble recovery after playing in all 13 of the Fighting Irish's games. Ogundeji opted to return for a fifth season after his senior year. He had seven sacks in his final season.

Statistics

Professional career
Ogundeji was selected by the Atlanta Falcons in the fifth round with the 182nd overall pick of the 2021 NFL Draft. He signed his four-year rookie contract with Atlanta on June 15, 2021.

NFL career statistics

References

External links
Notre Dame Fighting Irish bio

Living people
Players of American football from Michigan
Sportspeople from Oakland County, Michigan
American football defensive ends
Notre Dame Fighting Irish football players
People from West Bloomfield, Michigan
American sportspeople of Nigerian descent
1998 births
Atlanta Falcons players